The 1930 South Carolina Gamecocks football team was an American football team that represented the University of South Carolina as a member of the Southern Conference (SoCon) during the 1930 college football season. Led by third-year head coach Billy Laval, the Gamecocks compiled an overall record of 6–4 with a mark of 4–3 in conference play, tying for 11th place in the SoCon.

Schedule

References

South Carolina
South Carolina Gamecocks football seasons
South Carolina Gamecocks football